"So Much Unfairness of Things" is a short story written by C. D. B. Bryan.

Reprinted many times, the story was originally published in the June 2, 1962 issue of The New Yorker.   During the story, an exam taken by the protagonist is explicitly dated as June 7, 1962.

Plot Summary
Phillip Sadler Wilkinson, a 14 and 15-year-old student at Virginia Preparatory School (V.P.S.) has been held back for three years because of his failed Latin exam. Phillip, or P.S. as he's known to his friends and other students, claims he's studied but has very bad studying habits and is easily distracted. VPS has a long tradition of students, all bound by an honor code which requires students to report misdeeds like cheating - their own and those of others.  For the third year in a row, his Latin teacher, Dr. Fairfax, gives P.S. the exam. P.S. is desperate to pass, in order that he not displease his father, himself a VPS graduate, as were previous generations of Wilkinson men.  During the exam, P.S. finds a "cheat-sheet" in his desk, and uses it. P.S. is sure that no one saw him cheat, not even his friend, "Jumbo". After the exam, P.S. feels guilty but doesn't tell anyone. He smokes a cigarette in bathroom while contemplating what he has done. P.S. decides to live with his guilt. Nevertheless, P.S. soon learns that he was spotted cheating by Jumbo who, following the honor code, reports him, and P.S. is asked by Dr. Fairfax to come with him to the Honor Court where other Honor Committee members are there as well. At a school "honor court" P.S. is found guilty of cheating and is expelled from VPS.  P.S.'s father picks P.S. from school.  He is both disappointed with his son's actions and also confused by them.  The two leave school together.  The story suggests that despite P.S.'s misdeeds and punishment, an emotional gulf between the two is now more likely to be bridged.

References

External links
 Full text available at Internet Archive

1962 short stories
American short stories